Safet Berisha (11 November 1949 – 19 October 2016) was an Albanian football player who played for Lokomotiva Durrës and Partizani Tirana as well as the Albania national team, where he earned 20 senior caps.

Club career 
A tall defender, Berisha was raised in Durrës by his adoptive parents, which is where he joined the local side Lokomotiv Durrës as a youth player and was promoted to the senior squad by coach Loro Boriçi. In 1968 he was summoned to fulfil his military service and subsequently joined army club Partizani Tirana with whom he has won three championships, four cups and one Balkan Champion title.

International career
He made his debut for Albania in a December 1970 European Championship qualification match against Turkey in Istanbul and earned a total of 21 caps, scoring no goals. His final international was a November 1981 FIFA World Cup qualification match against West Germany.

Personal life
In 1992, he emigrated to Italy along with his family, firstly living in Bari for 6 years, then moving to Arezzo where he worked as an ambulance driver. He died in October 2016 in Italy after a short illness.

Honours 
Partizani Tirana
Kategoria Superiore (3): 1970–71, 1978–79, 1980–81
Kupa e Shqipërisë (3): 1969–70, 1972–73,  1979–80, 
Balkans Cup (1): 1970

References

External links
 

1949 births
2016 deaths
Footballers from Durrës
Albanian footballers
Association football defenders
Albania international footballers
Albania under-21 international footballers
KF Teuta Durrës players
FK Partizani Tirana players
Albanian expatriate sportspeople in Italy